Porthecla johanna is a butterfly in the family Lycaenidae. It is found in Peru and Ecuador in wet lowland forests at altitudes between 400 and 600 meters.

The length of the forewings is 15.5 mm for males. Adults are on wing year-round.

References

Butterflies described in 2011
Eumaeini